Christ Church, Cambridge may refer to:

 Christ Church (Cambridge, Massachusetts) in the United States
 Christ Church Cambridge in England

See also
 Christ's College, Cambridge